Glendalys Medina's practice focuses on transcending the symbolic systems of language and image by investigating the role they play in forming identity. Medina is currently a professor at SVA’s MFA Art Practice program and lives and works in New York.

Early life and education 
Medina is an interdisciplinary artist and received an MFA and BFA from Hunter College and studied at the Slade School of Fine Art under to tutelage of Phyllida Barlow and Eva Rothschild.

Career 
Medina's work has been presented at such notable venues as PAMM, Participant Inc., Performa 19, Artists Space, The Bronx Museum of Art, El Museo del Barrio, The Museum of Contemporary Art in Vigo, Spain, Smack Mellon and The Studio Museum in Harlem among others. Medina was a recipient of a Jerome Hill Foundation Fellowship (2019), an Ace Hotel New York City Artist Residency (2017), a SIP fellowship at EFA Robert Blackburn Printmaking Workshop (2016), a BACK IN FIVE MINUTES artist residency at El Museo Del Barrio (2015), a residency at Yaddo (2014, 2018), the Rome Prize in Visual Arts  (2013), a New York Foundation for the Arts Fellowship in Interdisciplinary Art (2012), and the Bronx Museum of the Arts AIM residency  (2010).

The Future is LATINX, Eastern Connecticut State University Art Gallery (2020-21) 
Medina's work was exhibited in the traveling group show The Future is LATINX, which debuted at Eastern Connecticut State University's Art Gallery. Exhibition Coordinator Yulia Tikhonova noted that the exhibition was intended to "draw attention to the rich cultural production of our Latino population as we continue on our path to becoming a 'minority white' nation [...] This community will dramatically change our politics, media, education, and cultural landscape. This is the future our exhibition anticipates." The Future is LATINX was on view at the Eastern Connecticut State University Art Gallery in Windham, Connecticut from October 8 - December 2, 2020. The exhibition traveled to Clark University's Schiltkamp Gallery under the title Latin + American from March 15 – May 9, 2021 and Three Rivers Community College in Norwich, Connecticut from August 30 – October 1, 2021. Amezkua showed her work alongside artists Tanya Aguiñiga, Blanka Amezkua, Alicia Grullón, Natalia Nakazawa, Esteban Ramón Pérez, Lina Puerta, Shellyne Rodriguez, Felipe Baeza, Lionel Cruet, David Antonio Cruz, Ramiro Gomez, Rafael Lozano-Hemmer, Dante Migone-Ojeda, and Vick Quezada. Medina exhibited the piece Ms. Puerto Rico and Mr. Borikén (2019) in The Future is LATINX.

References

External links 
Official site

American performance artists
Hunter College alumni
Alumni of the Slade School of Fine Art
Puerto Rican artists
Interdisciplinary artists
American women artists
Living people
Year of birth missing (living people)